Mihkel Jüris (also Mihail Jüris(son); 11 September 1907 Hellamaa Parish, Muhumaa – 22 October 1997 Stockholm) was an Estonian politician. He was a member of VI Riigikogu (its Chamber of Deputies).

References

1907 births
1997 deaths
People from Muhu Parish
People from Kreis Ösel
Farmers' Assemblies politicians
Patriotic League (Estonia) politicians
Members of the Estonian National Assembly
Members of the Riigivolikogu
Estonian World War II refugees
Estonian emigrants to Sweden